Ion Sessions "Speedy" Walker (December 12, 1906 – March 1, 2004) was a college football and basketball player for the Florida Gators. He served in the Army in World War 2.

Early years 
Walker was born in Olivet, Michigan to Osa Walker and Lottie Sessions. By 1920 his family has moved to Oldsmar.  Walker attended Hillsborough High School in Tampa, playing on the football team and basketball team with Dutch Stanley, where they were runner-up for the 1923 state football title, losing to Lakeland High School and Goof Bowyer.

University of Florida 
He was a prominent triple threat halfback for coach Tom Sebring's Florida Gators football teams in 1926 and 1927. The smallest member of the backfield, Walker played as a quarterback in 1924 on the freshman team.  He backed up Bowyer at quarterback on the varsity. He was also the senior captain of the basketball team during the 1927–28 season. He was a forward on the basketball team. He also lettered in baseball. He was inducted into the University of Florida Athletic Hall of Fame.

Coaching career 
Following graduation, he coached the athletic teams at Bay County High School in Panama City.

See also
 List of University of Florida Athletic Hall of Fame members

References

External links
 

1906 births
2004 deaths
American football halfbacks
American football quarterbacks
Forwards (basketball)
Florida Gators football players
Florida Gators men's basketball players
Sportspeople from Mobile, Alabama
Players of American football from Tampa, Florida
Basketball players from Tampa, Florida
American men's basketball players
People from Eaton County, Michigan
People from Oldsmar, Florida